Jutta Dorothea Haug (born 8 October 1951 in Castrop-Rauxel) is a German politician who served as a Member of the European Parliament from 1994 until 2014. She is a member of the Social Democratic Party of Germany, part of the Socialist Group.

During her time in parliament, Haug sat on the European Parliament's Committee on Budgets. She was also a substitute for the
Committee on the Environment, Public Health and Food Safety, substitute for the Delegation to the EU-Former Yugoslav Republic of Macedonia Joint Parliamentary Committee.

Other activities
 District Chair of the Association of Social-Democratic Women, Western Westphalia
 Member of Executive Committee
 Former Municipal Councillor in Herten

Career
 since 1994: Member of the European Parliament
 since 1999: Member of the SPD Executive (Social Democratic Party of Germany)

See also
2004 European Parliament election in Germany

External links
 
 
 

1951 births
Living people
Social Democratic Party of Germany MEPs
MEPs for Germany 1994–1999
MEPs for Germany 1999–2004
MEPs for Germany 2004–2009
MEPs for Germany 2009–2014
20th-century women MEPs for Germany
21st-century women MEPs for Germany